Hartland Sweet Snyder (1913, Salt Lake City – 1962) was an American physicist who along with Robert Oppenheimer calculated the gravitational collapse of a pressure-free sphere of dust particles as described by Einstein's general relativity, and found they contracted onto a radial distance, the Schwarzschild radius. It was later interpreted as the particles ending in the particles disappearing beneath the 'event horizon' associated with a Black Hole singularity. In recent years, it was shown by Trevor Marshall that the particle trajectories end in a shell of infinite density at the 'event horizon' radius, supporting the shell collapsar as endpoint.  Snyder’s argument that the “star thus tends to close itself off from any communication with a distant observer” which is quoted as an early inference of a Black Hole, does not follow from his model.  Only the very surface of the infinite density shell could reflect or emit radiation and solutions without a density singularity are needed to investigate the issue.

In 1955, Snyder bet against Maurice Goldhaber that antiprotons existed, and won.

Some publications he authored together with Ernest Courant laid the foundations for the field of accelerator physics. In particular, Hartland with Courant and Milton Stanley Livingston developed the principle of strong focusing that made modern particle accelerators possible. The Courant–Snyder parameters, a method of characterizing the distribution of particles in a beam, were an important part of that contribution.

See also 
 Quantum spacetime

References 

20th-century American physicists
Accelerator physicists
American relativity theorists
University of Utah alumni
University of California, Berkeley alumni
Northwestern University faculty
1913 births
1962 deaths